The 1948 Wightman Cup was the 20th edition of the annual women's team tennis competition between the United States and Great Britain. It was held at the All England Lawn Tennis and Croquet Club in London in England in the United Kingdom.

References

1948
1948 in tennis
1948 in American tennis
1948 in British sport
1948 in women's tennis
1948 sports events in London
1948 in English tennis